Michelle Hendley (born March 23, 1991) is an American actress and YouTube personality. She is known for her role as Ricky in the 2014 film Boy Meets Girl.

Career
Hendley was discovered by filmmaker Eric Schaeffer, who sought a transgender actress to play the lead role in Boy Meets Girl. Hendley had been documenting her transition on her YouTube video blog. After watching some of the videos, Schaeffer contacted Hendley to discuss the role. Hendley had not previously pursued a career as a performer, but reading the script and discussing the project with the director convinced her that the opportunity made sense.

Filmography

Film

Television

References

External links
 
 Hendley's video blog on YouTube

Living people
1991 births
21st-century American actresses
Actors from Columbia, Missouri
Actresses from Missouri
American film actresses
American YouTubers
American LGBT actors
LGBT people from Missouri
LGBT YouTubers
Transgender actresses